Alessandro Buongiorno (born 6 June 1999) is an Italian professional footballer who plays as a centre-back for Serie A club Torino.

Club career
On 14 February 2018, Buongiorno signed a professional contract with Torino, keeping him in the club until 2022. He made his Serie A debut for Torino in a 4–1 win over Crotone on 4 April 2018, coming on as a substitute in the 82nd minute.

In the 2018–19 season, he was loaned to Carpi in Serie B.

On 11 January 2020, Buongiorno joined Serie B club Trapani on loan until 30 June 2020.

International career 
Buongiorno took part in the 2019 FIFA U-20 World Cup with the Italy U20 squad.

On 13 October 2020, he made his debut with the Italy U21 playing as a starter in a qualifying match won 2–0 against Republic of Ireland in Pisa.

On 17 March 2023, Buongiorno received his first official callup to the senior Italian national team for two UEFA Euro 2024 qualifying matches against England and Malta.

Career statistics

Honours
Torino
Coppa Italia Primavera: 2017–18

Italy U20
FIFA U-20 World Cup fourth place: 2019

References

External links
 
 
 
 Serie A Profile
 FIGC Profile

1999 births
Living people
Footballers from Turin
Association football defenders
Italian footballers
Italy youth international footballers
Torino F.C. players
A.C. Carpi players
Trapani Calcio players
Serie A players
Serie B players